Åsa Jakobsson  (born 2 June 1966) is a former Swedish football player. She was part of the Sweden women's national football team. She competed at the 1996 Summer Olympics, playing three matches.

See also
 Sweden at the 1996 Summer Olympics

References

External links
 
 
 List of appearances at svenskfotboll.se

1966 births
Living people
Swedish women's footballers
Place of birth missing (living people)
Footballers at the 1996 Summer Olympics
Olympic footballers of Sweden
Sweden women's international footballers
1995 FIFA Women's World Cup players
Women's association footballers not categorized by position
Gideonsbergs IF players